Rettai Vaal Kuruvi is a 2015 Indian Tamil-language soap opera starring Ashwin Kumar Lakshmikanthan and Pavani Reddy as a divorced couple who rekindles their romance. It aired on Vijay TV from 1 June 2015 to 16 October 2015 on Monday to Friday at 9:00PM IST for 99 episodes. It was directed by Jerold, with cinematography by Vishwanathan and music by Saravanan.

Plot
The Romance Drama is about a divorced couple, who begin working at the same office.  Nila's father, plans to kill Bala as a revenge on his sister's husband. He brings two local goons from Madurai to kill Bala and is stabbed but survives by the timely help of Nila. Nila and Bala become closer to each other. But as soon as Bala finds out Nila's father tried to kill him he becomes furious on Nila too. Then he goes to his friend, Armugam's marriage in a village to refresh his mind without telling any of his relatives. On the other hand, Nila lies to everyone that she is interested in moving to America as she can't bear Bala's hatred towards her but, moves to the same village to which Bala goes, without knowing his presence in there. It turns out to be Nila, the friend of Arumugam's to be wife, Devayani. Bala and Nila try to be away from each other but as Nila's friends were flirting with Bala, jealousy grows within Nila which brings them closer. Deyvani's mum and Arumugam's sister in law plan to bring them together in various ways, but none work.
Pazhani, Deyvani's brother who went to prison for a murder regularly met her secretly, which Bala noticed and doubted on the bride. Without knowing Pazhani to be Devayani's brother, Bala brings the meeting to public, where Pazhani is hit by the village people.
Though Bala and Nila get to know about each other's love, they're not expressing it. To ask forgiveness Bala and his friends visit the Deyvanai's place, but Pazhani beats them up. And due to sympathy the family forgives them but a nota for the marriage. Nila really feels sorry and both of them confess their love again. On the same day Nila gets hit by a car and is admitted in a hospital. Due to Nila's critical condition, her family moves her to Germany for treatment, without Bala's knowledge. Bala's passport is blocked by Nila's father ruining all ways to reach her. After few years Nila's sister in law calls Bala and tells him Nila doesn't remember her past. Without anyone revealing about Bala as her HUSBAND, she writes Bala's name on her own whenever she gets a paper. So they realise her love and reunite Bala and Nila with a new start. However Bala tells Nila, that he was her close friend. So she tells him to take her to places they have visited before in his bike. And they start over again.

Cast
Main Cast
 Ashwin Kumar Lakshmikanthan as Balamurugan/Bala
 Pavani Reddy as Vennilla/Nila

Supporting character
 Ramrath Reddy
 Renuka
 Sathana
 Kethumurthi
 Neeliya
 Jayathish
 Sneha
 Pirabha
 Manikandan
 Priya

Awards and nominations

International broadcast
The Series was released on 1 June 2015 on Vijay TV. The Show was also broadcast internationally on Channel's international distribution. 
 It was aired in Sri Lanka, Singapore, Vietnam, Japan, Hong Kong, United States, Europe, Malaysia, Mauritius and South Africa on Vijay TV. 
 In Canada, the drama aired on Tamil Canadians-oriented channel on Asian Television Network 9:30 hours after its original Tamil Nadu broadcast with English Subtitle.
 The drama is episodes on their App hotstar. with English subtitle.

References

External links
Official Website on Hotstar

Star Vijay original programming
Tamil-language television shows
2010s Tamil-language television series
2015 Tamil-language television series debuts
2015 Tamil-language television series endings